Sana Nuestra Tierra is the twenty-first album released by Christian singer Marcos Witt. The album was recorded live from Houston, Texas. This album was winner of the Latin Grammy for Best Christian album.

Track listing
"Sánanos" - 06:53
"Sana Nuestra Tierra" - 06:13
"Mi Primer Amor" - 05:59
"Levántate Y Sálvame" - 09:16
"Las Naciones Proclamen" - 11:47
"Acuérdate Oh Señor" - 04:11
"Esperamos En Ti" - 06:53
"Grandes Cosas Ha Hecho El Señor" - 06:01
"Aleluya A Nuestro Dios" - 07:23
"Danzaré, Cantaré" - 07:52

Credits
Producers:
 Juan Salinas
 Marcos Witt

Executive Producer:
 Marcos Witt

Arrangers:
 Isaac Escamilla
 Holger Fath
 Emmanuel Espinosa

Worship Leader:
 Marcos Witt

Musicians:
 Randall Gonzalez - Drums
 Holger Fath - Electric Guitar, Acoustic Guitar
 Alan Villatoro - Keyboards
 Emmanuel Espinosa - Bass
 Wiso Aponte - Acoustic Guitar, Electric Guitar
 Isaac Escamilla - Keyboards

Vocalists:
 Lucy Esquilin - Vocals
 Vanyo Esquilin - Vocals
 Nolita Theo - Vocals

Engineer:
 Orlando Rodriguez - Engineer, Mixing
 Alex Rodriguez - Assistant Mixing
 Hank Williams - Cover Design
 Ruth Salinas - Photography

Lo Mejor de Marcos III
 "Mi Primer Amor"
 "Danzaré, Cantaré"

2001 live albums
Marcos Witt live albums
Latin Grammy Award for Best Christian Album (Portuguese Language)